OHM: The Early Gurus of Electronic Music is a compilation of early electronic music and excerpts from 1948 to 1980. Many works are essentially experiments with sound, using a variety of non-traditional instruments including homemade circuits, tape ribbon, and early synthesisers.

Artists featured in the compilation include: 

 Maryanne Amacher
 Robert Ashley
 Milton Babbitt
 Louis and Bebe Barron
 François Bayle
 David Behrman
 John Cage
 John Chowning
 Alvin Curran
 Holger Czukay
 Tod Dockstader
 Charles Dodge
 Herbert Eimert and Robert Beyer
 Brian Eno
 Luc Ferrari
 Jon Hassell
 Paul Lansky
 Hugh Le Caine
 Alvin Lucier
 Otto Luening
 Richard Maxfield
 Olivier Messiaen
 Musica Elettronica Viva (MEV)
 Pauline Oliveros
 Bernard Parmegiani
 Steve Reich
 Terry Riley
 Jean-Claude Risset
 Clara Rockmore
 Oskar Sala
 Pierre Schaeffer
 Klaus Schulze
 Raymond Scott
 Laurie Spiegel
 Karlheinz Stockhausen
 Morton Subotnick
 David Tudor
 Vladimir Ussachevsky
 Edgard Varèse
 Iannis Xenakis
 La Monte Young
 Joji Yuasa

References

External links
Interviews and Essays by Jason Gross on Ohm: The Early Gurus of Electronic Music

2000 compilation albums
Electronic compilation albums